William Barrow may refer to:

 William Barrow (priest) (1754–1836), English Anglican Archdeacon of Nottingham, 1830–1832
 William Barrow (bishop) (died 1429), Bishop of Bangor and of Carlisle
 William Barrow (Jesuit) (1609–1679), English Jesuit
 William Barrow (chemist) (1904–1967), American chemist
 William Hodgson Barrow (1784–1876), English Conservative politician who sat in the House of Commons from 1851 to 1874